Cebu Pacific Flight 387 was a domestic Cebu Pacific flight from Ninoy Aquino International Airport in Metro Manila to Lumbia Airport in Cagayan de Oro. On February 2, 1998, the 31-year-old McDonnell Douglas DC-9-32 crashed on the slopes of Mount Sumagaya in Claveria. The incident resulted in the deaths of all 104 passengers and crew on board.

Background

Aircraft
The aircraft involved in the accident was a McDonnell Douglas DC-9 (registration number RP-C1507) and was delivered to Air Canada in September 1967 before acquired by Cebu Pacific in March 1997.

Passengers and crew
In command of the flight was Captain Paulo Justo. His co-pilot was First Officer Erwin Golla. There were five crew members and 94 Filipino passengers, including five children. Five passengers were from Australia, Austria, Japan, Switzerland and Canada. Additionally, a surgeon on a medical mission was from the United States, totaling 104 passengers.

Accident
The plane left Manila at 01:00 GMT and was scheduled to arrive at 03:03 GMT in Cagayan de Oro. The plane made a stopover at Tacloban on 02:20 GMT, though sources differ about whether it was a scheduled or unscheduled stop. According to one source, the flight made an unscheduled stop at Tacloban to deliver a needed airplane tire for another Cebu Pacific aircraft in Tacloban. The last contact was 15 minutes before the plane was due to land, with the airport's ATC. There was no indication that the plane was in trouble.

Cause
The cause of the crash is still a source of controversy in the Philippines. Colonel Jacinto Ligot was the chief of the Philippine Air Force rescue team, which faced difficulties due to the deep ravines and dense vegetation on the slopes of the mountain. The pilots were flying visually, not instrumentally, when the plane vanished from radar. While the skies were clear at the airport, the mountains may have been covered by fog. Chief of Staff General Clemente Mariano speculated that the plane "almost cleared the top of the mountain, but it may have suffered a down-draft, causing it to hit the mountain." This error might have misled the pilots to believe that they were clear of terrain, while in fact they were flying dangerously low. The ATO, on the other hand, pointed out in its official report deficiencies in the training of the pilots.

References

External links 

Airliner accidents and incidents caused by pilot error
Aviation accidents and incidents in the Philippines
Aviation accidents and incidents in 1998
Accidents and incidents involving the McDonnell Douglas DC-9
History of Misamis Oriental
1998 disasters in the Philippines
Cebu Pacific
February 1998 events in Asia
Aviation accident investigations with disputed causes